Erin Marie Aldrich (born December 27, 1977, in Dallas, Texas) is an American high jumper and volleyball player. 

She competed at the 2000 Olympic Games, in high jump.

Life 
After graduating Lake Highlands High School, she played volleyball at the highest level, competing for the United States women's national volleyball team. From 2007 to 2008, she played for NEC Red Rockets.

She competed at the university level for the Texas Longhorns in both sports.

Her high jump career included finishing fourth at the 2001 Summer Universiade. She also competed at the 2000 Olympic Games and the World Championships in 1997, 2001, 2005 and 2007 without reaching the final.

Achievements
All results regarding high jump.

References

External links
 
 Erin Aldrich at USATF

1977 births
Living people
American female high jumpers
American women's volleyball players
Athletes (track and field) at the 2000 Summer Olympics
Olympic track and field athletes of the United States
World Athletics Championships athletes for the United States
Volleyball players at the 2003 Pan American Games
Pan American Games bronze medalists for the United States
Track and field athletes from Dallas
Pan American Games medalists in volleyball
Competitors at the 2001 Summer Universiade
Medalists at the 2003 Pan American Games
Texas Longhorns women's volleyball players
Texas Longhorns women's track and field athletes